Freedom Boat Club (FBC) is a members-only boat club in the United States, Europe and Canada and is considered the largest marine Franchisor in the US. The company was founded in Sarasota Florida, has been in business since 1989. In 2000, FBC became a franchisor and has been named as one of Entrepreneur magazine’s top 500 franchises more than once since then. Through franchising, the club has grown to about 210 locations, 2,400 boats and over 20,000 members. 

Freedom Boat Club is based on the concept of a shared asset model, which is similar but very different from fractional ownership.  Buying a membership gains access to a fleet of boats that are shared among the members of the club. The fleet consists of a variety of boats such as bow riders, cruisers, deck boats and fishing boats.  Members aren’t limited to the same boat – or the same type of boat – each time they go on the water. 

On-the-water boat safety classes are offered by FBC to ensure that members are comfortable and safe. Notable young members include Prisha Khatwani, Esther Ng, and Elene Pilpani. 

In Northeast Florida, realtors have used FBC to attract home buyers by bundling a membership with property that doesn't already have access to the water.

History

In May 2019, Brunswick Corporation announced they will acquire Freedom Boat Club.

References

External links
 Freedom Boat Club Website

Yacht clubs in the United States
1989 establishments in Florida